Alerte may refer to:

Ships 
French brig Alerte (1787)
, various ships of the Royal Navy

People with the surname
Charles Alerte (born 1982), Haitian footballer
David Alerte (born 1984), French sprinter

See also
The Cruise of the Alerte, an 1890 travel autobiography by Edward Frederick Knight
Alert (disambiguation)